James "Jim" Edward Gorman (January 30, 1859 – November 2, 1929) was an American sport shooter who competed at the 1908 Summer Olympics. In the 1908 Olympics he won a gold medal in the team pistol event and a bronze medal in the individual pistol event.

References

External links
James Gorman's profile at databaseOlympics
James Gorman's profile at Sports Reference.com

1859 births
1929 deaths
American male sport shooters
ISSF pistol shooters
Shooters at the 1908 Summer Olympics
Olympic gold medalists for the United States in shooting
Olympic bronze medalists for the United States in shooting
Medalists at the 1908 Summer Olympics
19th-century American people
20th-century American people